The Competition Tribunal is a federal adjudicative body in Canada that makes findings in regard to competition laws under the Competition Act.

Restrictive Trade Practices Commission
The tribunal was first known under its former name, the Restrictive Trade Practices Commission. The Commission was empowered to investigate suspected offenses under the Combines Investigation Act, the precursor to the modern Competition Act.

Competition Tribunal 
In 1986, the Government of Canada introduced simultaneously the Competition Act and the Competition Tribunal Act. The Act dissolved the Restrictive Trade Practices Commission and created the Competition Tribunal and the Competition Bureau. Unlike the Commission, the Competition Tribunal has no authority to investigate offenses. Rather, it simply can make findings and issue remedial orders. The Competition Bureau carries out investigations.

Body 
The Tribunal is made up of both judges and expert lay people. Judges adjudicate issues of law, while judges and lay people may adjudicate issues of mixed law and fact. The Tribunal's decisions may be appealed to the Federal Court of Appeal.

Cases 
As of 2012, the Competition Tribunal had adjudicated only six contested merger cases. The vast majority of cases are resolved by the Bureau prior to reaching the Tribunal.

In 2015, the Tribunal ruled in favour of Canadian Real Estate Association in a case brought by the Bureau. The Bureau argued that a number of restrictions imposed by the CREA on private sellers hoping to list their homes on multiple listing service were contrary to a 2010 deal. The Tribunal later scheduled a rehearing on the issue in September 2015.

References

External links
 Competition Tribunal website

Competition law
1986 in Canadian law